The Rocher Déboulé Range, formerly known as the Roche Déboulé Mountains, is a subrange of the Bulkley Ranges, located south of Hazelton in northern British Columbia, Canada.

See also
 Hagwilget Peak

References

Rocher Déboulé Range in the Canadian Mountain Encyclopedia

Hazelton Mountains